The 2022–23 Alaska Nanooks men's ice hockey season is the 73rd season of play for the program and the 38th at the Division I level. The Nanooks represented the University of Alaska Fairbanks and were coached by Erik Largen in his 4th season.

Season

Departures

Recruiting

Roster
As of August 12, 2022.

Standings

Schedule and results

|-
!colspan=12 style=";" | Exhibition

|-
!colspan=12 style=";" | Regular Season

Scoring statistics

Goaltending statistics

Rankings

References

2022–23
Alaska
Alaska
Alaska
Alaska